Central Forest Nature Reserve (also, Tsentralno-Lesnoi) is zapovednik (strict ecological reserve) in the north-west of Russia, located in Andreapolsky and Nelidovsky Districts of Tver Oblast, in the upper course of the Mezha River. It was established on 4 May 1930. The nature reserve is created to protect the conifer forest in the upper course of the Western Dvina River. Since 1985, it is classified as UNESCO Biosphere Reserve.

Geography
The nature reserve is located at the south-western part of the Valdai Hills, close to the divide between the drainage basins of the Atlantic (the Western Dvina and the Lovat) and the Caspian Sea (the Volga). It includes a part of the lake district which is formed at the divide. The landscape within the nature reserve is mainly hilly, with a large area occupied by swamps.

Ecoregion and climate
The reserve is in the Sarmatic mixed forests ecoregion, a band of mixed oak/spruce/pine forests stretching from southern Sweden to the Ural Mountains.  The climate is Humid continental climate, cool summer (Köppen climate classification (Dfb)). This climate is characterized by large swings in temperature, both diurnally and seasonally, with mild summers and cold, snowy winters

Flora and fauna
The area is covered by forest, with spruce being the most common tree, followed by silver birch, common aspen, and grey alder. The latter three species mainly grow in the areas damaged from timber logging in the 1950s. The reserve lies at the southernmost limit of the area where dwarf birch grows.

As of 1988, 55 mammal species could be found in the reserve. These include Eurasian brown bear, lynx, red fox, moose, wild boar, and roe deer. Eurasian beaver was reintroduced in 1936. There were 195 species of birds, 6 species of amphibians, and several reptile species as well.

History
Field research aimed at establishing a nature reserve in Central Russia started in 1926. The area south of the current location of the nature reserve was designated, however, the nature reserve was not established, and timber companies quickly cut all the forest there, so that the nature reserve had to be established in the upper course of the Mezha. The nature reserve was established on 4 May 1930 and opened on 31 December 1931. It contained two parts, one at the current location and another one close to the Zemtsy railway station.

In 1951, the nature reserve was abolished, and timber production started. In 1981, a protected area was created around the borders of the nature reserve. Timber logging is prohibited in this protected area.

References

External links
 Relief Map of the Reserve (Central Forest Official Web Site
  Map of Tsentralno-Lesnoi Nature Reserve, OpenStreetmap.org
  Map of Tsentralno-Lesnoi Nature Reserve, ProtectedPlanet.net

Geography of Tver Oblast
Nature reserves in Russia
Protected areas established in 1930
Protected areas established in 1960
1930 establishments in Russia
Zapovednik